Volume 4 is the 16th studio album by British musician Joe Jackson, released in 2003. It was the first album to feature the Joe Jackson Band since the 1980 release, Beat Crazy, and it was Jackson's first rock 'n' roll album since Laughter and Lust, which was released in 1991. As before, the Joe Jackson Band consisted of Jackson, Graham Maby, David Houghton and Gary Sanford. Jackson said at the time that he expected the songs on the album to be "in the spirit of the first couple of albums, but with a bit of the greater maturity I'd like to think I've acquired. And I've still got a 32-inch waist — so I don't think it's going to be embarrassing".

In another interview, Jackson explained the origins of the album's inception. He said,

It was released to moderately positive reviews. Rolling Stone rated it 3/5, stating that it was less visceral than his early-1980s music, but that "when it comes to edgy, sensitive-guy rock, he proves on Volume 4 that he still is the man." AllMusic rated it 3.5/5, stating that "Volume 4 isn't as lively or vital as his first five albums, but it's also more satisfying as a pop record than anything he's done since Body & Soul, which is more than enough to make it a worthy comeback." The album was followed by a lengthy tour.

Track listing
All songs written, arranged and produced by Joe Jackson.

Personnel
 Musicians
 Joe Jackson – piano, organ, electric piano, melodica, lead vocals
 David Houghton – drums, backing vocals
 Graham Maby – bass, backing vocals
 Gary Sanford – guitar, backing vocals

 Production
 Joe Jackson - arrangements, producer
 Julie Gardner - recording engineer
 Helen Atkinson - assistant recording engineer
 Sean Slade, Paul Kolderie - mixing engineer
 Juan Garcia - assistant mixing engineer
 Ted Jensen, Nathan James - mastering engineer
 Frank Orlinsky - art direction
 Geoff Spear, Spencer Rowell, Tom Sheehan - photography

Covers 
 Dark Blue World covered "Take It Like a Man" on the 2004 album Different for Girls: Women Artists and Female-Fronted Bands Cover Joe Jackson.

Charts

References

External links 
 Volume 4 album information at The Joe Jackson Archive

2003 albums
Joe Jackson (musician) albums
Rykodisc albums